The 2014 Ohio Attorney General election was held on November 6, 2010, concurrently with other statewide offices including the Gubernatorial election. Incumbent Republican Attorney General and former 2-term United States Senator Mike DeWine was challenged by former member of the Hamilton County, Ohio Board of Commissioners and candidate for Auditor in 2010 David Pepper. DeWine won in a landslide winning 61% of the vote to Pepper's 38%, a 23-point margin of victory. 

As of 2022, this along with many other concurrently held statewide races is the last time Franklin County was won by a Republican.

Republican primary

Candidates

Declared
 Mike DeWine, incumbent Attorney General, former U.S. Senator, former lieutenant governor of Ohio, and  former U.S. Representative.

Democratic primary

Candidates

Declared
 David Pepper, former member of the Hamilton County Ohio Board of Commissioners, Democratic nominee for Auditor in 2010.

General election

Polling

Results

See also
 2014 Ohio elections
 2014 United States elections
 2014 Ohio gubernatorial election

Footnotes

2014 Ohio elections
2014
Ohio